Ignacio Jesús Laquintana Marsico (born 1 February 1999) is a Uruguayan professional footballer who plays as a midfielder for Peñarol.

Club career
Laquintana is a youth academy graduate of Defensor Sporting. He made his professional debut for the club on 8 September 2018 in a 1–1 draw against Cerro.

International career
Laquintana is a former Uruguay youth national team player. He has appeared for under-20 team in friendlies.

Honours
Peñarol
 Uruguayan Primera División: 2021
 Supercopa Uruguaya: 2022

References

External links
 

1999 births
Living people
Footballers from Paysandú
Association football midfielders
Uruguayan footballers
Uruguay youth international footballers
Uruguayan Primera División players
Uruguayan Segunda División players
Defensor Sporting players
Peñarol players